Homosassa blanchardi is a species of snout moth in the genus Homosassa. It was described by Jay C. Shaffer in 1976. It was described from the US state of Texas.

The forewings are dark brown.

References

Moths described in 1976
Anerastiini